Storm surge is the rise of water surface associated with a low pressure weather system. It may also refer to:
 Storm Surge (ride), a ride at Thorpe Park
 Storm Tide (film), a 1927 German silent film